T. J. Gottesdiener is an architect and managing partner of the New York office of Skidmore, Owings & Merrill (SOM).  A graduate of Cooper Union’s Irwin S. Chanin School of Architecture, Gottesdiener joined SOM in 1980 and was made Partner in 1994.  He lives with his wife in New York City; they have one son.

Gottesdiener is a fellow of the American Institute of Architects.

Career

Gottesdiener is committed to enhancing the built environment of New York City and has been responsible for some of SOM’s most complex and challenging projects in Manhattan. Closely involved in the revitalization of Lower Manhattan and the redevelopment of the World Trade Center site, he has played a major role in the planning and phasing for the design and construction of 13 million square feet of commercial construction in cooperation with agencies responsible for the memorial, cultural, and transportation functions. He was Managing Partner for 7 World Trade Center, which was completed in 2006, and One World Trade Center (“the Freedom Tower”), which was completed in July 2013.

Summary of work
Other important New York City projects include the  Time Warner Center Development; the headquarters of the New York Mercantile Exchange in Battery Park City; the 44-story Bear Stearns Headquarters Building in midtown Manhattan; Times Square Site 1, a  office building in the heart of Times Square; and the renovation of the landmark Lever House building. He is currently working on two of Manhattan’s most high-profile projects: the One World Trade Center and the new Moynihan Station. Along with his project responsibilities, Gottesdiener is also responsible for management and operations for SOM’s New York office.

Internationally, he has worked extensively in Brazil (five projects totaling 5 million square feet) and The Philippines (five projects totaling more than 4 million square feet), and current projects in Asia. He has also been involved in a range of architecture and interiors projects for financial and corporate clients including the New York Stock Exchange, JP Morgan, Alcoa, Salomon Brothers, and Citibank.

Projects

New York
One World Trade Center, the Freedom Tower
7 World Trade Center
Time Warner Center
Bear Stearns Headquarters
Times Square Tower
Lever House Renovation
New York Mercantile Exchange
Random House Tower Headquarters
101 Warren Street
Moynihan Station Redevelopment

International
Tokyo Midtown, Tokyo, Japan
AIG Tower, Hong Kong
Ben Gurion International Airport, Terminal 3 (landside terminal), Tel Aviv, Israel
PhilAm Life Headquarters, Manila, Philippines
Lotte Super Tower, Seoul, Korea
Esentai Park, Esentai, Kazakhstan
Almaty Financial District, Almaty, Kazakhstan

Civic involvement

Gottesdiener is also involved in some of the city’s most important real estate and design organizations, such as the Real Estate Board of New York, the Metropolitan Museum of Art where he acts as the Vice Chairman of the Real Estate Council, and at his alma mater, The Cooper Union, where he is an advisor for the Dean Search Committee, among many other community initiatives.

Fellow, American Institute of Architects
Vice Chairman, Metropolitan Museum of Art Real Estate Council
Council for Urban Development Mixed Use, Urban Land Institute
Board member, International Center of Photography
President’s Advisory Board, Cooper Union
Member, Council of Tall Buildings and Urban Habitat
Member, Real Estate Board of New York
Member, Skyscraper Museum
Honorary Fellow, Philippine Institute of Architects

Education
Bachelor of Architecture, 1979, Irwin S. Chanin School of Architecture at The Cooper Union
Trinity College, 1973–1975
Pomfret School, 1971-1973

Awards
Presidents Citation in Architecture, Cooper Union

External links
SOM (Skidmore, Owings & Merrill)
T.J. Gottesdiener - SOM Biography

See also
Skidmore, Owings & Merrill
David Childs
Roger Duffy
William F. Baker (engineer)
Ross Wimer
Craig W. Hartman
Philip Enquist

References 

Living people
Year of birth missing (living people)
20th-century American architects
Cooper Union alumni
Fellows of the American Institute of Architects
21st-century American architects